Henry Sebastian D'Souza (20 January 1926 – 27 June 2016) was an Indian Roman Catholic bishop.

Born in Igatpuri, D'Souza was ordained a priest in 1948. He became Bishop of Cuttack-Bhubaneswar in 1974 and was named coadjutor Archbishop of Calcutta in 1985. D'Souza retired in 2002 as Archbishop of Calcutta and started the Life Ascending- a monthly newsletter for the elderly. He died at the age of 90 in 2016 at Vianney Home, Kolkata. He was the Archbishop of Calcutta (Kolkata) when Saint Mother Teresa was in her later years and upon her death in the year 1997, helped initiate and support her sainthood.

References

External links

1926 births
2016 deaths
21st-century Roman Catholic archbishops in India
People from Nashik district
20th-century Roman Catholic archbishops in India